D Battery Royal Horse Artillery are a Close Support Battery of 3rd Regiment Royal Horse Artillery They are currently based in Albemarle Barracks in Newcastle Upon Tyne.

History 
In 1812, during the Peninsular War, the battery was part of Wellington's Army, where the battery participated in the Battle of Salamanca.

See also

British Army
Royal Artillery
Royal Horse Artillery
List of Royal Artillery Batteries

References

Bibliography

External links
 
 
 

Royal Horse Artillery batteries
Royal Artillery batteries
1794 establishments in Great Britain
Military units and formations established in 1794